The Malta Workers Party (MWP) was a political party in Malta.

History
The party was established in 1949 by Paul Boffa after he resigned as leader of the Labour Party following a motion of no confidence. Both parties won 11 seats in the 1950 elections, allowing the Nationalist Party (which won 12 seats) to form the government. In the elections the following year the Labour Party won 14 seats and the Workers Party won seven, with The Workers' Party joining a coalition government with the Nationalist Party.

The party's support declined rapidly, and it won only three seats in the 1953 elections. It was disbanded in 1955.

Ideology
The party ran on a platform of co-operation with the British authorities in order to promote Maltese interests. It called for economic austerity and diverting funds to industrial development. Boffa publicly accused Labour Party leader Dom Mintoff of being a Communist and anti-clericalist.

Electoral performance

References

Defunct political parties in Malta
Political parties established in 1949
Political parties disestablished in 1955
1949 establishments in Malta
1955 disestablishments in Malta
Catholic political parties